Myristica crassa is a species of plant in the family Myristicaceae. It is found in Peninsular Malaysia,  Singapore and Borneo.

References

crassa
Trees of Malaya
Trees of Borneo
Near threatened plants
Taxonomy articles created by Polbot